In mathematics, a Priestley space is an ordered topological space with special properties. Priestley spaces are named after Hilary Priestley who introduced and investigated them. Priestley spaces play a fundamental role in the study of distributive lattices. In particular, there is a duality ("Priestley duality") between the category of Priestley spaces and the category of bounded distributive lattices.

Definition
A Priestley space is an ordered topological space , i.e. a set  equipped with a partial order  and a topology , satisfying 
the following two conditions:

  is compact.
(This condition is known as the Priestley separation axiom.)

Properties of Priestley spaces
 Each Priestley space is Hausdorff.
To see this, one proceeds as follows. By the Priestley separation axiom, there exists a clopen up-set or a clopen down-set containing  and missing . The intersection of these clopen neighborhoods of  does not meet .

It follows that for each Priestley space , the topological space  is a Stone space; that is, it is a compact Hausdorff zero-dimensional space.

Some further useful properties of Priestley spaces are listed below.

Let  be a Priestley space.

A Priestley morphism from a Priestley space  to another Priestley space  is a map  which is continuous and order-preserving.

Let Pries denote the category of Priestley spaces and Priestley morphisms.

Connection with spectral spaces
Priestley spaces are closely related to spectral spaces.

Theorem:

Theorem:
If  is a spectral space, then  is a Priestley space.

In fact, this correspondence between Priestley spaces and spectral spaces is functorial and yields an isomorphism between Pries and the category Spec of spectral spaces and spectral maps.

Connection with bitopological spaces
Priestley spaces are also closely related to bitopological spaces.

Theorem:
If  is a Priestley space, then  is a pairwise Stone space.

The correspondence between Priestley spaces and pairwise Stone spaces is functorial and yields an isomorphism between the category Pries of Priestley spaces and Priestley morphisms and the category PStone of pairwise Stone spaces and bi-continuous maps.

Thus, one has the following isomorphisms of categories:

One of the main consequences of the duality theory for distributive lattices is that each of these categories is dually equivalent to the category of bounded distributive lattices.

See also
 Spectral space
 Pairwise Stone space
 Distributive lattice
 Stone duality
 Duality theory for distributive lattices

Notes

References
 
 
 
 
 
 

Topology
Topological spaces